Cognitive complexity describes cognition along a simplicity-complexity axis. It is the subject of academic study in fields including personal construct psychology, organisational theory and human–computer interaction.

History

First proposed by James Bieri in 1955.

In artificial intelligence
In an attempt to explain how humans perceive relevance, cognitive complexity is defined as an extension of the notion of Kolmogorov complexity. It amounts to the length of the shortest description available to the observer. For example, individuating a particular Inuit woman among one hundred people is simpler in a village in Congo than it is in an Inuit village.

Cognitive complexity is related to probability (see Simplicity theory): situations are cognitively improbable if they are simpler to describe than to generate.
Human individuals attach two complexity values to events:
 description complexity (see above definition)
 generation complexity: the size of the minimum set of parameter values that the 'world' (as imagined by the observer) needs to generate the event.

To 'generate' an event such as an encounter with an Inuit woman in Congo, one must add up the complexity of each event in the causal chain that brought her there. The significant gap between both complexities (hard to produce, easy to describe) makes the encounter improbable and thus narratable.

In computer science

In human–computer interaction, cognitive (or psychological) complexity distinguishes human factors (related to psychology and human cognition) from, for example, computational complexity.

In psychology

Cognitive complexity is a psychological characteristic or psychological variable that indicates how complex or simple is the frame and perceptual skill of a person.

A person who is measured high on cognitive complexity tends to perceive nuances and subtle differences which a person with a lower measure, indicating a less complex cognitive structure for the task or activity, does not.

It is used as part of one of the several variations of the viable non-empirical evaluation model GOMS (goals, operators, methods, and selection rules); in particular the GOMS/CCT methodology.

Cognitive complexity can have various meanings:

 the number of mental structures we use, how abstract they are, and how elaborately they interact to shape our perceptions.
 "an individual-difference variable associated with a broad range of communication skills and related abilities ... [which] indexes the degree of differentiation, articulation, and integration within a cognitive system".

Related terms
Related to cognitive complexity is the term behavioral complexity, used by some researchers in organizational studies, organizational culture and management.

See also
 Cognitive dimensions of notations
 Cognitive ergonomics
 Consciousness
 General semantics
 Language of thought
 Learning theory (education)
 Simplicity theory
 Social complexity

References

Further reading
 
 Bryan, S. (2002). "Cognitive complexity, transformational leadership, and organizational outcomes". Dissertation in the Department of Communication Studies, Graduate Faculty of the Louisiana State University and Agricultural and Mechanical College.
 Chater, N. (1999). The search for simplicity: A fundamental cognitive principle? The Quarterly Journal of Experimental Psychology, 52 (A), 273–302.
 Dobosh, M.A. (2005). "The impact of cognitive complexity and self-monitoring on leadership emergence". Master's Thesis in the Department of Communication, Graduate Faculty of the University of Delaware.
 McDaniel, E., & Lawrence, C. (1990). "Levels of cognitive complexity: An approach to the measurement of thinking." New York: Springer-Verlag. 
 Lee, J., Truex, D.P. (2000). "Cognitive complexity and methodical training: enhancing or suppressing creativity". Proceedings of the 33rd Hawaii International Conference on Systems Sciences.
 Sanders, T.J.M. "Coherence, causality and cognitive complexity in discourse".
 Streufert, S., Pogash, R.M., Piasecki, M.T. (1987). "Training for cognitive complexity". ARI Research Note 87–20, AD-A181828.

External links
 A tutorial on Simplicity Theory (Simplicity, Complexity, Unexpectedness, Cognition, Probability, Information)
 COGNITIVE COMPLEXITY CLASSIFICATION  OF FCATTEST ITEMS
 Cognitive Complexity/Depth of Knowledge Rating
 ANALYZING ORGANIZATIONS THROUGH COGNITIVE COMPLEXITY
 Cognitive Complexity as a Personality Dimension

Cognitive psychology
Human communication
Human–computer interaction
Industrial and organizational psychology
Personality